SS Winifred was a cargo and passenger Lake Victoria ferry in East Africa.

The Uganda Railway had begun shipping operations on the lake in 1901 with the launch of the 110 ton , built by Bow, McLachlan and Company of Paisley in Renfrewshire, Scotland. She was a small general purpose vessel but the company wished to establish more substantial ferry operations. Accordingly, even before William Mackinnon was launched the company ordered the much larger Winifred and her sister ship SS Sybil from the same builder.

Bow, McLachlan built Winifred and Sybil in 1901. They were "knock down" vessels; that is, each was bolted together in the shipyard at Paisley, all the parts marked with numbers, disassembled into many hundreds of parts and transported in kit form by sea to Kenya for reassembly. Winifred was launched on the lake in 1902 and Sybil in 1903.

In the First World War East African Campaign Winifred and Sybil were armed as gunboats. After the Armistice they returned to civilian service. However, on occasion Winifred or Sybil substituted for a larger ship, as for example in 1924 when Clement Hill was drydocked and Winifred temporarily took over its route between Kenya and Uganda.

Later Winifred was found to be unseaworthy. In 1936 Kenya and Uganda Railways and Harbours scuttled her to form a breakwater off Luamba Island. Her remains were scrapped in 1954.

References

1901 ships
Ships built on the River Clyde
Lake Victoria
Ships sunk as breakwaters